For the 1947–48 season, Carlisle United F.C. competed in Football League Third Division North.

Results & fixtures

Football League Third Division North

FA Cup

References

 11v11
 Rochdale AFC: The Official History 1907–2001 by Steven Phillipps.

External links

Carlisle United F.C. seasons